The 2007 V8 Supercar Challenge is the eleventh round of the 2007 V8 Supercar season. It will be held on the weekend of the 18 to 21 October at the Surfers Paradise Street Circuit in Queensland.

Results

Qualifying

Race 1 results

Race 2 results

External links
 Lexmark Indy 300 website (archive from 2007)
 Official race results

V8 Supercar Challenge
Gold Coast Indy 300
Sport on the Gold Coast, Queensland